Zhengzhou–Wanzhou high-speed railway is a high-speed railway connecting Zhengzhou, the capital of Henan province, and Wanzhou District in Chongqing. The section between Zhengzhou East and Xiangyang East started operation on 1 December 2019. It connects with the Chongqing–Wanzhou intercity railway. The line forms part of the Hohhot–Nanning corridor.

The railway was approved by the National Development and Reform Commission in 2014. Construction began in 2016, and the line fully opened in June 2022.

History
The Zhengzhou to Xiangyang section opened on 1 December 2019. The remaining section between Xiangyang and Wanzhou opened on 20 June 2022.

Stations

References

High-speed railway lines in China
Rail transport in Henan
Railway lines opened in 2019